The Laurence Professorship of Classical Archaeology at the University of Cambridge was established in 1930 as one of the offices endowed by the bequest of Sir Perceval Maitland Laurence.

Laurence Professors of Classical Archaeology
 Arthur Bernard Cook (1931–1934)
 Alan John Bayard Wace (1934–1944)
 Arnold Walter Lawrence (1944–1951)
 Jocelyn Mary Catherine Toynbee (1951–1962)
 Robert Manuel Cook (1962–1976)
 Anthony McElrea Snodgrass (1976–2001)
 Martin Millett (2001–2022)
 Michael Squire (2022–)

References

 
Classical Archaeology, Laurence
Faculty of Classics, University of Cambridge
Classical Archaeology, Laurence, Cambridge
Classical Archaeology, Laurence, Cambridge
1930 establishments in England